Jean Alfred Marioton (3 September 1863, Paris - 6 April 1903, Paris) was a French painter. His brothers Claudius and Eugène were both sculptors.

Sources
https://plus.google.com/photos/110518326794196755618/albums/6137314159719915553?banner=pwa

French painters
Artists from Paris
1863 births
1903 deaths